Stratonicea, Stratoniceia or Stratonikeia, also found as Stratonice, Stratoniki, Stratonike, can refer to any of several Hellenistic cities, including:

Stratonicea (Caria), formerly Idrias and Chrysaoris, and later Hadrianopolis, east-southeast of Mylasa, now at Eskihisar, Muğla Province, Turkey
Stratonicea (Lydia), now in Manisa Province, Turkey
Stratonicea (Chalcidice), on the Akte Peninsula, Chalcidice, Greece